Beitske Visser (born 10 March 1995) is a Dutch racing driver. 

She has raced in kart, single-seater, GT and prototype series.

Career

Karting
Born in Dronten, Visser began karting in 2007 and raced in various European and International championships, working her way up from the junior ranks to progress through to the KZ1 category by 2011, when she finished in tenth position in the CIK-FIA European KZ1 Championship.

First car race
On 6 August, 2011, Visser made her car racing debut in the Supercar Challenge at Assen Circuit, in the GT class, driving a Praga R4S. Despite a 25-second penalty, she passed Roger Grouwels towards the end of the race she claimed her first car racing win in her race debut.

Open-wheel racing
ADAC Formel Masters
2012 saw her début in the ADAC Formel Masters championship with Lotus, also known as Motopark Academy. Visser finished eighth in the championship with wins at Zandvoort and EuroSpeedway Lausitz, and another ten point-scoring finishes.

She joined the Red Bull Junior Team racing academy at the start of the 2013 season but was dropped from the program at the end of the season.

She remained in the series with the team for the 2013 season; she won one race during the season, at the Sachsenring, and finished eighth again, in the final championship standings.

GP3 Series
In 2014, Visser competed in the opening round of the GP3 Series with Hilmer Motorsport. She also competed in the Spa-Francorchamps round of the 2015 season with Trident.

Formula Renault 3.5 Series
As well as the GP3 Series, Visser graduated to the Formula Renault 3.5 Series in 2014, joining AVF. She scored her first point during Race 1 at Spa-Francorchamps. She completed two seasons with Adrian Valles' team, before switching to Teo Martín Motorsport in 2016. She scored a best result of 5th (Jerez 2016) and a best finish of 13th in the championship (2016).

Hiatus
Visser left Formula V8 at the end of 2016, and took up a development role with a student team from Eindhoven University of Technology (Automotive Technology InMotion), who were developing an electric open-wheeler. In June 2017, the team broke the EV lap record at Zandvoort, going 16 seconds faster than the previous best.

Formula E
Visser became, alongside Bruno Spengler, one of the test and reserve drivers for Andretti Autosport ahead of the 2018–19 Formula E season.

W Series
Visser was accepted into the qualifying stages of the 2019 W Series to be held at the Wachauring in January 2019, and subsequently qualified as one of the 18 regular drivers. She finished second in the championship to Jamie Chadwick with four podiums including a win at Zolder.

The Dutchwoman was set to contest the 2020 championship before it was cancelled in response to the COVID-19 pandemic. A 10-event eSports series was held on iRacing in its place, with Visser taking the championship with a round remaining.

She was 8th in the 2021 W Series, and 2nd in the 2022 W Series.

Endurance racing
GT4
In mid-2017, she was admitted into the BMW Junior Driver programme, where she was entered into the 2017 GT4 European Series Southern Cup alongside German driver Dennis Marschall. The pairing won the penultimate round of the campaign in Barcelona. She and Marschall will continue in the class in 2018.

LMP2
Visser made her prototype début in the 2020 European Le Mans Series for Signature Team, replacing regular driver Katherine Legge after she was injured testing the teams' Oreca 07 at Circuit Paul Ricard. She finished 6th in the 4 Hours of Spa-Francorchamps alongside Tatiana Calderón and André Negrão, and 11th in the Le Castellet 240 partnering Sophia Flörsch.

Racing record

Career summary

† As Visser was a guest driver, she was ineligible to score points.

Complete Formula V8 3.5 Series results
(key) (Races in bold indicate pole position) (Races in italics indicate fastest lap)

† Driver did not finish, but was classified as she completed over 90% of the race distance.

Complete GP3 Series results
(key) (Races in bold indicate pole position) (Races in italics indicate fastest lap)

Complete 24 Hours of Nürburgring results

Complete W Series results
(key) (Races in bold indicate pole position) (Races in italics indicate fastest lap)

Complete European Le Mans Series results
(key) (Races in bold indicate pole position; results in italics indicate fastest lap)

Complete 24 Hours of Le Mans results

Complete FIA World Endurance Championship results
(key) (Races in bold indicate pole position) (Races in italics indicate fastest lap)

References

External links
 

1995 births
Living people
Dutch racing drivers
Dutch female racing drivers
Karting World Championship drivers
ADAC Formel Masters drivers
World Series Formula V8 3.5 drivers
Dutch GP3 Series drivers
Sportspeople from Dronten
W Series drivers
24H Series drivers
24 Hours of Le Mans drivers
European Le Mans Series drivers
FIA World Endurance Championship drivers
International GT Open drivers
Hilmer Motorsport drivers
Teo Martín Motorsport drivers
Motopark Academy drivers
AV Formula drivers
Signature Team drivers
Trident Racing drivers
Nürburgring 24 Hours drivers
Michelin Pilot Challenge drivers
GT4 European Series drivers